Ihor Vyacheslavovych Krasnopir (born 1 December 2002) is a Ukrainian professional footballer who plays as a forward for Obolon Kyiv.

Career
Born in Kyiv, Krasnopir is a product of a local academy school systems, before joined some amateurs clubs and subsequently transferring to the professional Obolon Kyiv in the Ukrainian First League in August 2022.

International career
In November 2022, Krasnopir was called up for the first time to the Ukraine under-21 team as a reserve squad player, ahead of friendly matches vs Israel under-21 and Georgia under-21.

References

External links
 
 

2002 births
Living people
Footballers from Kyiv
Ukrainian footballers
Association football forwards
Ukraine under-21 international footballers
FC Obolon-Brovar Kyiv players
Ukrainian First League players